This is a list of Imperial German infantry regiments before and during World War I. In peacetime, the Imperial German Army included 217 regiments of infantry (plus the instruction unit, Lehr Infantry Battalion). Some of these regiments had a history stretching back to the 17th Century, while others were only formed as late as October 1912.

Pre-War

Wartime regiments 

On mobilisation, the German Army raised 113 Reserve Infantry Regiments (of 332 battalions) and 96 Landwehr Infantry Regiments (of 294 battalions). Meanwhile a number of existing units of various sizes were expanded. The Lehr Infantry Battalion was expanded to form the Lehr Infantry Regiment. Throughout the war Germany also mustered numerous new infantry regiments.

Reserve regiments

New regiments

See also 

Bavarian Army
List of Imperial German artillery regiments
List of Imperial German cavalry regiments
List of German Jäger units

References

Bibliography 
 
 
 
 

 
 
German
Imperial German infantry regiments